Donald Muller (November 26, 1917 – December 12, 2012), known professionally as Don Medford, was an American television director who directed over 75 TV series between 1951 and 1989, and who also directed three movies.

Medford directed the final two-part episode of the 1960s television series The Fugitive and the final episode of the 1980s television series The Colbys. He directed 26 episodes of the 80's smash hit soap opera Dynasty (1981 TV series). He also directed the violent 1971 Western film The Hunting Party.

He died on 12 December 2012 at aged 95 in West Hills, California.

Filmography

Films
 To Trap a Spy (1964)
 Cosa Nostra, Arch Enemy of the FBI (1967)
 Ghostbreakers (1967)
 Incident in San Francisco (1971)
 The Hunting Party (1971)
 The Organization (1971)
 The Fuzz Brothers (1973)
 The November Plan (1977)
 The Clone Master (1978)
 Coach of the Year (1980)
 Sizzle (1981)
 Dusty (1983)

Individual episodes
 The Twilight Zone
 "A Passage for Trumpet" (1960) 
 "The Man in the Bottle" (1960)
 "The Mirror" (1961)
 "Deaths-Head Revisited" (1961)
 "Death Ship" (1963)
 Dynasty (1981-1988) (26 episodes)

References

External links 
 

1917 births
2012 deaths
American television directors